Leonardo Montero is an Argentine television host. mide 1.80 metros

Awards

Nominations
 2013 Martín Fierro Awards
 Best male TV host (for Am, Antes del Mediodía)

References

Argentine television personalities
People from Córdoba Province, Argentina
Living people
1972 births